Ramón Almengor (known as Siarke; died 22 January 1922) was the last king of the indigenous Bribris. The son of María Saldaña and Floripo Almengor, he was the nephew of Antonio Saldaña, the last king of Talamanca who died in 1910. While Saldaña enjoyed the recognition of Bribris, Cabécares, Changuinolas and Borucas and of the recognition (although only ceremonial) of the government of Costa Rica, Siarke was only recognized by the Bribris. He died of tuberculosis at the San Juan De Dios Hospital in San José on 28 January 1922.

References

People from Limón Province
20th-century Costa Rican people
Costa Rican politicians
Pretenders
1922 deaths
Bribri people
20th-century deaths from tuberculosis
20th-century monarchs in North America
Tuberculosis deaths in Costa Rica